Banana beer is an alcoholic beverage made from fermentation of mashed bananas. Sorghum, millet or maize flour are added as a source of wild yeast.

Etymology
In Uganda, banana beer is known as mubisi, in DR Congo as Kasiksi, in Kenya as urwaga, and in Rwanda and Burundi as urwagwa.

Background
Banana beer is sometimes consumed during rituals and ceremonies. A similar product called mwenge bigere is made in Uganda with only bananas and sorghum. It can also be found under the names kasiksi, nokrars, rwabitoke, urwedensiya, urwarimu and milinda kaki.

Production

Banana beer is made from ripe (but not over-ripe) East African Highland bananas (Musa acuminata Colla (AAA-EA), Mbidde clone set). To accelerate the ripening of bananas, a hole is dug in the ground, lined with dried banana leaves which are then set on fire. Fresh banana leaves are laid on top of them, and then the unripe bananas. These are then covered by more fresh banana leaves and pseudostems. After four to six days, the bananas are ripe enough. This method only works in the dry season. During the rainy season, bananas are ripened by putting them on a hurdle near a cooking fire.

There are two types of banana that are used for banana beer: the harsh tasting igikashi and the milder tasting igisahira. The banana beer mixture consists of one third igikashi and two thirds igisahira. Once ripened, the bananas are peeled. If they cannot be peeled by hand, they are not ripe enough. After peeling, the bananas are kneaded until soft. The juice is then filtered to get clear banana juice, which is then diluted with water. Sorghum is ground and lightly roasted and then added to the juice. This mixture is left to ferment for 24 hours and then filtered.

After filtering, the beer is packaged in glass or plastic bottles. In commercial production, the beer may first be pasteurized before packaging to stop fermentation and extend shelf life.

Varieties
In Tanzania there is a banana beer called mbege, still brewed in a traditional way.

Commercial brands include:
 Mongozo Banana Beer
 Raha
 Agashya

See also
 Banana wine: another product which can be retrieved from banana

References

Beer in Africa
Burundian cuisine
Drugs in Burundi
Kenyan cuisine
Rwandan cuisine
Tanzanian cuisine
Ugandan cuisine
Drugs in Rwanda
Types of beer
Banana drinks